The 2020 FIM Moto3 World Championship was a part of the 72nd F.I.M. Road Racing World Championship season. The season calendar has been significantly affected by the COVID-19 pandemic, leading to the cancellation or postponement of many races.

Albert Arenas won the Riders' championship while riding a KTM RC250GP. Honda won its fourth straight Constructors' championship and its 20th overall in the Moto3 class. Leopard Racing won its second straight Teams' championship.

Teams and riders

All teams used series-specified Dunlop tyres.

Team changes
 Tech3 joined the Moto3 class after KTM's withdrawal from Moto2.
 Husqvarna returned to Moto3 after a 4-year absence with Sterilgarda Max Racing Team.
 WorldwideRace Team shut down after twenty-two seasons.
 Sterilgarda Max Racing Team and Red Bull KTM Ajo both have expanded to two riders.
 Angel Nieto Team reverted to their former name of Aspar.

Rider changes
 Leopard Racing have run 2 different riders from the previous season – Jaume Masiá, who joins from the WorldwideRace team, and Dennis Foggia, who joins from Sky Racing Team VR46. They replaced Lorenzo Dalla Porta and Marcos Ramírez, who've moved up to Moto2 with Italtrans Racing Team and American Racing respectively.
 Arón Canet moved up to Moto2 with Aspar Team. He was replaced at Sterilgarda Max Racing Team by Alonso López, who joins from Estrella Galicia 0,0.
 Filip Salač left PrüstelGP to join VNE Snipers, replacing Romano Fenati, who joined Sterilgarda Max Racing Team.
 Jakub Kornfeil was originally intended to leave PrüstelGP to join Boe Skull Rider Mugen Race. However, in January 2020, Kornfeil announced his retirement from professional racing. His seat was taken by Davide Pizzoli, who made his full season debut in Moto3.
 Jason Dupasquier and Barry Baltus made their debut with PrüstelGP.
 Andrea Migno returned to Sky Racing Team VR46 after two seasons.
 Maximilian Kofler made his full season debut in Moto3, joining CIP Green Power. He became the first Austrian rider to compete as a regular rider since Michael Ranseder in the 2009 season.
 2019 Red Bull MotoGP Rookies Cup winner Carlos Tatay made his full season debut with Reale Avintia Racing.
 Khairul Idham Pawi returned to Moto3 by joining Petronas Sprinta Racing. He replaced Ayumu Sasaki, who joined Red Bull KTM Tech3.
 Yuki Kunii signed for Honda Team Asia to replace Kaito Toba who joined Red Bull KTM Ajo.
 Raúl Fernández joined Red Bull KTM Ajo to replace Can Öncü who moved to the Supersport World Championship.
 Deniz Öncü made his full season debut with Red Bull KTM Tech3.
 Riccardo Rossi left Gresini Team to join Boe Skull Rider Mugen Race, replacing Makar Yurchenko whose contract was terminated.

Mid-season changes
 Dirk Geiger replaced Barry Baltus for the first race due to age restriction.
 Tony Arbolino, despite testing negative for COVID-19, was forced to miss the Aragon Grand Prix as he had come into close contact with an infected passenger on his flight after the French Grand Prix and was required to self-isolate as a result. He was not replaced for that event and was back to racing at the Teruel Grand Prix.
 Adrián Fernández replaced Filip Salač for the Portuguese Grand Prix because of an injury.

Calendar
The following Grands Prix are scheduled to take place in 2020:

The following rounds were included on the original calendar, but were cancelled in response to the COVID-19 pandemic:

Calendar changes
The Thailand Grand Prix was moved from being the 15th round of 2019 to the 2nd round of 2020. 
The Argentine Grand Prix and Grand Prix of the Americas swapped places in the calendar order.
The German Grand Prix and Dutch TT also swapped places, with Germany moving to 21 June, while the Assen round remained in its traditional position on the final weekend of June.
The Finnish Grand Prix was reintroduced to the calendar after a 38-year absence. The venue hosting the round will be the new Kymi Ring, instead of the Tampere Circuit used in 1962 and 1963 or the Imatra Circuit which hosted the round until 1982.
The Aragon Grand Prix was moved from the last week of September to the first week of October. It was later returned to its original schedule to allow for the rescheduled Thailand Grand Prix.

Calendar changes as a reaction to COVID-19 pandemic
The season calendar has been significantly affected by the COVID-19 pandemic, leading to the cancellation or postponement of many races.
The Qatar Grand Prix proceeded for Moto2 and Moto3 as planned despite cancellation of the premier class race, as the teams were already in Qatar for their final pre-season test before the quarantine measures were implemented.
The Thailand Grand Prix was postponed on 2 March due to COVID-19 concerns. It was later planned to take place on 4 October, shifting the Aragon Grand Prix forward by a week.
The Grand Prix of the Americas was postponed from 5 April to 15 November after the City of Austin implemented a state of emergency. The Valencian Grand Prix was subsequently shifted back by one week to 22 November to accommodate the Austin rescheduling.
The Argentine Grand Prix was postponed to 22 November, further shifting the finale in Valencia to 29 November.
The Spanish Grand Prix was postponed on 26 March.
The French Grand Prix was postponed on 2 April.
The Italian and Catalan Grands Prix were postponed on 7 April.
The German Grand Prix was postponed on 17 April after the German government announced a ban of all large gatherings until at least 31 August.
The Dutch TT was postponed on 23 April after the Dutch government announced a ban on all mass events until at least 1 September.
The Finnish Grand Prix was postponed on 24 April.
The German, Dutch and Finnish rounds were officially cancelled on 29 April. For the first time in the championship's history, the Dutch TT was absent from the calendar.
The British and Australian rounds were cancelled on 29 May.
The Japanese round was cancelled on 1 June.
The Italian round was officially cancelled on 10 June.
On 11 June, a new schedule based in Europe was announced. The season is to contain 5 "double-headers" on consecutive weekends at Jerez, Austria, Misano, Aragon, and Valencia to achieve a minimum of 13 races.
The European Grand Prix returned to the calendar for the first time since 1995, held at Ricardo Tormo Circuit as the first round of the Valencian double-header.
The Grand Prix of the Americas was officially cancelled on 8 July.
The Argentine, Thai and Malaysian rounds were officially cancelled on 31 July.
On 10 August, the Portuguese Grand Prix was announced to be staging the final race of the 2020 season at the Autódromo Internacional do Algarve in Portimão. It will mark the first Portuguese Grand Prix since 2012 when it was held at the Autódromo do Estoril. Portimão has been MotoGP's reserve track since 2017.

Results and standings

Grands Prix

Riders' standings
Scoring system
Points were awarded to the top fifteen finishers. A rider had to finish the race to earn points.

Constructors' standings
Each constructor received the same number of points as their best placed rider in each race.

Teams' standings
The teams' standings were based on results obtained by regular and substitute riders; wild-card entries were ineligible.

Notes

References

Moto3
Grand Prix motorcycle racing seasons